The 2016 Vermont Republican presidential primary was held on March 1, 2016 along with ten other state nominating contests during Super Tuesday. 

Donald Trump held a big edge in Vermont polls, with John Kasich and Marco Rubio splitting much of the rest of the vote. However, on election day, Donald Trump only narrowly won the popular vote by 2.3%, and tied with John Kasich in the delegate count.

Polling

Results

Delegates were awarded to candidates who got 20% or more of the vote proportionally.

Analysis 
Vermont's voter base is much more moderate and irreligious than the Southern Super Tuesday contests. Exit polls by Edison Research showed this benefitted Trump and Kasich: Trump carried somewhat conservative voters with 35% of the vote, but John Kasich won moderates with 40% to Trump's 34%. Kasich did particularly well in the populous Burlington metro, holding Trump to a narrow margin statewide.

Turnout dropped in the Vermont Republican primary compared with 2012, as some registered Republicans crossed over to vote for favorite son Bernie Sanders in the Democratic primary.

See also
 2016 Vermont Democratic presidential primary

References

Vermont
2016 in Vermont
Vermont Republican primaries
Republican presidential primary